Arjuna (Sanskrit: अर्जुन), also known as Partha and Dhananjaya, is one of the chief protagonists of the Hindu epic Mahabharata. In the epic, he is the third among five Pandava brothers, from the royal line of the Kuru Kingdom. In the Mahabharata War, Arjuna was a key warrior from the Pandava side and killed many warriors including his own elder brother Karna unknowingly and his grandfather Bhishma. Before the beginning of the war, his mentor, Krishna, gave him the supreme knowledge of Bhagavad Gita to overcome his moral dilemmas.

Arjuna was the son of Kunti-the wife of Kuru King Pandu-and the god Indra, who fathered him due to Pandu's inability to bear children. Arjuna excelled in archery from an early age and enjoyed the favour of his preceptor, Drona. Arjuna is depicted as a skilled archer, winning the hands of Draupadi, who became the common wife of the Pandavas. Arjuna is twice exiled, first for breaking a pact with his brothers; and secondly together with them when his oldest brother was tricked into gambling away the throne. During the first exile Arjuna married Ulupi, Chitrāngadā and Subhadra. From his four wives, Arjuna had four sons, one from each wife  Shrutakarma, Iravan, Babhruvahana and Abhimanyu. During his second exile, Arjuna gained many celestial weapons. Despite being a warrior, Arjuna was also skilled in music and dance. At the end of the epic, Pandavas, accompanied by Draupadi, retired to the Himalayas,when everyone slowly died and came into heaven, including Arjuna.

Etymology and epithets
According to Monier Monier-Williams, the word Arjuna means white, clear or silver. He is known by many other names, such as:

 Dhanañjaya (धनञ्जय) – one who conquered wealth and gold
 Guḍākesha (गुडाकेश) – one who has conquered sleep (the lord of sleep, Gudaka+isha) or one who has abundant hair (Guda-kesha), like an ascete keshin.
 Vijaya (विजय) – always victorious, invincible and undefeatable
 Savyasāchī (सव्यसाची)– one who can shoot arrows using the right and the left hand with equal activity;Ambidextrous.
 Shvetavāhana (श्वेतवाहन) – one with milky white horses mounted to his pure white chariot
 Anagha (अनघ) – one who is sinless
 Bībhatsu (बीभत्सु) – one who always fights wars in a fair, stylish and terrific manner and never does anything horrible in the war
 Kirīṭī (किरीटी) – one who wears the celestial diadem presented by the King of Gods, Indra
 Jiṣṇu (जिष्णु) – triumphant, conqueror of enemies
 Phālguṇa (फाल्गुण) – born under the star Uttara Phalguni (Denebola in Leo)
 Mahābāhu (महाबाहु) – one with large and strong arms
 Gāṇḍīvadhārī (गाण्डीवधारी) – holder of a bow named Gandiva
 Pārtha (पार्थ) – son of Pritha (or Kunti) – after his mother
 Kaunteya (कौन्तेय) – son of Kunti – after his mother
 Pāṇḍuputra (पाण्डुपुत्र) – son of Pandu – after his father
 Pāṇḍava (पाण्डव) – son of Pandu – after his father
 Kṛṣṇā (कृष्णा) –  He who is of dark complexion and conducts great purity.
 Bṛhannalā (बृहन्नला) – another name assumed by Arjuna for the 13th year in exile

Literary background
The story of Arjuna is told in the Mahabharata, one of the Sanskrit epics from the Indian subcontinent. The work is written in Classical Sanskrit and is a composite work of revisions, editing and interpolations over many centuries. The oldest parts in the surviving version of the text probably date to about 400 BCE.

The Mahabharata manuscripts exist in numerous versions, wherein the specifics and details of major characters and episodes vary, often significantly. Except for the sections containing the Bhagavad Gita which is remarkably consistent between the numerous manuscripts, the rest of the epic exists in many versions. The differences between the Northern and Southern recensions are particularly significant, with the Southern manuscripts more profuse and longer. Scholars have attempted to construct a critical edition, relying mostly on a study of the "Bombay" edition, the "Poona" edition, the "Calcutta" edition and the "south Indian" editions of the manuscripts. The most accepted version is one prepared by scholars led by Vishnu Sukthankar at the Bhandarkar Oriental Research Institute, preserved at Kyoto University, Cambridge University and various Indian universities.

Life and legends

Birth and early life

Arjuna was one of the five Pandava brothers of royal lineage, whose collective name derives from their father and heir to the Lunar dynasty, Pandu. However, Pandu was under a curse whereby he would die if he had sexual relations with a woman and thus his sons were born using a mantra given to Kunti by sage Durvasa during her maiden days. His wivesMadri and Kuntiinvoked different gods and were blessed with children. According to the legend, Arjuna was a demigod, who was born as a blessing after his mother Kunti invoked the god Indra on her husband's request. Whilst the other epic such as Devi Bhagavata also records Arjuna as a reincarnation of a rishi called Nara.

Despite being the younger brother of Dhritarashtra, it was Pandu who succeeded their father as king of Bharata. This was because Dhritarashtra was blind, a disability that caused him to forfeit his right to the royal succession. Dhritarashtra fathered 100 sons, known as the Kaurava brothers, and ascended the throne on the death of Pandu. The Pandava brothers were then brought up with their cousins, the Kauravas, and the education of all these boys was supervised by Bhishma. Among their teachers was the brahmin warrior called Drona, who considered Arjuna to be his favourite. According to Swami Parmeshwaranand, Arjuna was Drona's most accomplished pupil. He notes an incident where Drona deemed that out of all his students, none but Arjuna had the steadfast focus to shoot the eye of a toy bird on a tree using a bow and arrow, and that Drona was proven right.

After the princes completed their training, Arjuna defeated Drupada of Panchala, who was impressed by the prince's skills, as the gurudakshina for his beloved teacher Drona. Later, Duryodhana and his maternal uncle Shakuni planned to burn Pandavas alive along with their mother Kunti. They built a palace out of lac in a village named Varanāvata. The Pandavas, though, managed to escape the house of lac with the help of Vidura through a secret tunnel.

Marriages and children

Arjuna is a central character in the Hindu epics and appears in hundreds of situations. Among the most notable is his marriage to Draupadi, the fire born daughter of Drupada, who was the king of Panchala.

After the event of Lakshagriha, Arjuna, his mother and brothers decide to hide from Hastinapura. One day, Arjuna learns that Drupada is holding an archery tournament to determine who should marry his daughter. The tournament was to lift and string a bow, and fire arrows to pierce the eye of a golden fish only by looking at its reflection in the water. At the Swayamvara, almost all the assorted monarchs were unable to complete the challenge. In the end, Arjuna, dressed as a Brahmin, wins the tournament. Annoyed by their defeat, the kings attack Arjuna, but he defeats them and runs home to tell his mother of his success, shouting "look what we have found". Commentators vary as to whether Kunti thought he was referring to alms found in the forest or to some great prize unknown to her. She tells him that the find must be shared with his brothers, as they had always shared such things in the past.

This misunderstanding, combined with the protocol that the oldest of the brothers, Yudhishthira, should marry first, leads to the agreement that all five brothers marry her. This is one of the rare examples of polyandry in Sanskrit literature. The brothers agreed that none should intrude if Draupadi was alone with one of the others, the penalty for doing so is a year to be spent in exile during which the culprit must remain celibate.

When Arjuna, his siblings, mother and Draupadi returned to Hastinapura, Dhritarashtra determined to avoid a rivalry developing for control of Hastinapur by splitting the kingdom, with half of it being left to his own eldest son, Duryodhana, and half to the eldest son of Pandu, Yudhishthira.

Arjuna inadvertently broke the pact with his brothers, intruding as he sought to collect weapons whilst Yudhishthira, was alone with Draupadi. He felt obliged to go into exile despite Yudhishthira's attempts to dissuade him. It was this event that led to him forming a close relationship with his cousin Krishna because he ignored the celibacy condition of the pact and married three people on his travels, the first of whom was a Naga princess named Ulupi, with whom he had a son called Iravan. His second marriage was with a princess of Manipura, Chitrangada, who bore a son named Babhruvahana. The third was with Subhadra, the sister of Krishna. This last event, which took place in Dvaraka, is not the first meeting between Krishna and the Pandavas in the story but it does mark the start of a bond, sealed with the birth of the couple's child, Abhimanyu, whom Krishna adores.

Burning of Khandava Forest

It was while at Indraprastha, the capital city of the Pandavas, for the birth of Abhimanyu that Arjuna and Krishna become involved in what Alf Hiltebeitel describes as "one of the strangest scenes of the epic", this being the burning of the Khandava Forest. This story within a story has been interpreted in various ways.

The essence of this part of the myth is that Arjuna and Krishna are in the forest when they are approached by a hungry person. They agree to help satisfy his hunger, at which point he reveals himself to be Agni, the god of fire. Agni's hunger can only be sated by consuming the entire forest and everything in it but his previous attempts to do this were thwarted by Indra, who is a protector of the forest and sent down rains to quench the fire. The cousins agree to fend off Indra and anyone else who might interfere; to this end, Arjuna armed himself with the Gandiva bow and Krishna with his Sudarshana Chakra, weapons suitable for a fight with the gods. They then begin to destroy the forest, battling against Indra and other gods, as well as demons, animals and snakes. Once the forest has gone, after six days of fire and slaughter, Arjuna and Krishna receive thanks from Indra, who had retreated with the other gods partway through the proceedings on being commanded by a mysterious voice to step back and watch.

The game of dice

As heir to the lordship of Kurukshetra, Yudhishthira had attracted the unwelcome attention of his Kaurava cousin, Duryodhana, who sought the throne. The royal consecration involved an elaborate Vedic ceremony called rajasuya which extended over several years and included the playing of a ritualised game of dice. This particular game, described as "Indian literature's most notorious dice game" by Williams, was rigged by Duryodhana, causing Yudhishthira to gamble and lose everything, including his kingdom and his shared wife Draupadi. He and his brothers only obtained their freedom because Draupadi offered herself to the Kauravas in exchange. She was then humiliated by them so much that revenge for her treatment became a further motivation for the Pandavas in the rivalry with their cousins. During her humiliation, Karna called her a whore for marrying five men. This led Arjuna to take a vow of killing Karna. The brothers, including Arjuna, were forced into a 12-year exile, to be followed by a year living incognito if Yudhishthira was to regain his kingdom.

Exile of the Pandavas

While in this exile, Arjuna performed twelve labours. He received instruction in the use of weapons from Parashurama, the sixth avatar of Vishnu, and visited the Himalayas to get celestial weapons that he would be able to use against the Kauravas. Thereafter, he honed his battle skills with a visit to Swarga, the heaven of Indra, where he emerged victorious in a battle with the Daityas and also fought for Indra, his spiritual father, with the Gandiva.

After the battle at Khandava, Indra had promised Arjuna to give him all his weapons as a boon for matching him in battle with the requirement that Shiva is pleased with him. During the exile, following the advice of Krishna to go on meditation or tapasya to attain this divine weapon, Arjuna left his brothers for a penance on Indrakeeladri Hill.

When Arjuna was in deep meditation, a wild boar ran towards him. He realized it and took out an arrow and shot it at the boar. But, another arrow had already pierced the boar. Arjuna was furious and he saw a hunter there. He confronted the hunter and they engaged in a fight. After hours of fighting, Arjuna was not able to defeat him and realized that the hunter was Shiva. Shiva was pleased and took his real form. He gave him Pashupatastra and told that the boar was Indra as he wanted to test Arjuna. After gaining the weapon, Indra took him to heaven and gave him many weapons.

During his exile, Arjuna was invited to the palace of Indra, his father. An apsara named Urvashi was impressed and attracted to Arjuna's look and talent so she expresses her love in front of him. But Arjuna did not have any intentions of making love to Urvashi. Instead, he called her “mother”. Because once Urvashi was the wife of King Pururavas the ancestor of Kuru dynasty. Urvashi felt insulted and cursed Arjuna that he will be a eunuch for the rest of his life. Later on Indra's request, Urvashi curtailed the curse to a period of one year.

At Matsya Kingdom 

Arjuna spent the last year of exile as a eunuch named Brihannala at King Virata’s Matsya Kingdom. He taught song and dance to the princess Uttarā. After Kichaka humiliated and tried to molest Draupadi, Arjuna consoled her and Bhima killed Kichaka. When Duryodhana and his army attacked Matsya, Uttar, Uttarā's brother, with Brihannala as his charioteer went to the army. Later that day, the year of Agyatavasa was over. Arjuna took Uttar away from the army to the forest where he had kept his divine bow, Gandiva and revealed his identity to Uttara. Later when he revealed his identity to everyone in the Matsya, Uttarā was married to Arjuna's son Abhimanyu.

Kurukshetra War

Bhagavat Gita 

The Bhagavad Gita is a book within the Mahabharata that depicts a dialogue between Arjuna and Krishna immediately prior to the commencement of the Kurukshetra War between the Pandavas and Kauravas. According to Richard H. Davis,

In the war 

Arjuna was a key warrior in Pandava's victory in the Kurukshetra War. He killed many powerful and key warriors of Kaurava's side.

 Fall of Bhishma: On the 10th day of battle, Shikhandi accompanied Arjuna on the latter's chariot and they faced Bhishma who did not fire arrows at Shikhandi. He was then felled in battle by Arjuna, pierced by innumerable arrows. With Sikhandi in front, Bhishma did not even look in that direction, Arjuna shot arrows at Bhishma, piercing his entire body.
 Death of Bhagadatta: On the 12th day of the war, Arjuna killed powerful king of Pragjyotisha Bhagadatta, along with his mighty elephant Supratika.
 Death of Jayadratha: Arjuna learns that Jayadratha blocked the other four Pandavas, at the entrance of Chakravyuha, due to which Abhimanyu entered alone and was killed unfairly by multiple Kaurava warriors on the 13th day of the war. Arjuna vowed to kill him the very next day before sunset, failing which he would kill himself by jumping in a fire. Arjuna pierced into the Kaurava army on the 14th day, killing 7 aukshohinis (1.5 million) of their army, and finally beheaded Jayadratha on 14th day of the war.
 Death of Sudakshina : He killed Sudakshina the king of Kambojas on the 14th day using Indrastra killing him and a large part of his army.
Death of Susharma: Arjuna on the 13th day, killed king Susharma of Trigarta Kingdom, the main Kaurava ally.
 Death of Karna: The much anticipated battle between Arjuna and Karna took place on the 17th day of war. The battle continued fiercely and Arjuna killed Karna by using Anjalikastra.

Later life and death
After the Kurukshetra War, Yudhishthira appointed Arjuna as the Prime Minister of Hastinapur. Yudhishthira performed Ashvamedha. Arjuna followed the horse to the land of Manipura and encountered Babhruvahana, one of his sons. None of them knew one another. Babhruvahana asked Arjuna to fight and killed his father during the battle. Chitrāngadā came to the battlefield and revealed that Arjuna was her husband and Babhruvahana's father. Ulupi, the second wife of Arjuna, revived Arjuna using a celestial gem called Nagamani.

After Krishna left his mortal body, Arjuna took the citizens of Dwaraka, including 16,100 wives of Krishna, to Indraprastha. On the way, they were attacked by a group of bandits. Arjuna desisted fighting seeing the law of time.

Upon the onset of the Kali Yuga and acting on the advice of Vyasa, Arjuna and other Pandavas retired, leaving the throne to Parikshit (Arjuna's grandson and Abhimanyu's son). Giving up all their belongings and ties, the Pandavas, accompanied by a dog, made their final journey of pilgrimage to the Himalayas. The listener of the Mahabharata is Janamejaya, Parikshit's son and Arjunaś great-grandson.

Outside Indian subcontinent

Indonesia

In the Indonesian archipelago, the figure of Arjuna is also known and has been famous for a long time. Arjuna especially became popular in the areas of Java, Bali, Madura and Lombok. In Java and later in Bali, Arjuna became the main character in several kakawin, such as Kakawin Arjunawiwāha, Kakawin Pārthayajña, and Kakawin Pārthāyana (also known as Kakawin Subhadrawiwāha. In addition, Arjuna is also found in several temple reliefs on the island of Java, for example the Surawana temple.

Wayang story 

Arjuna is a well-known figure in the world of wayang (Indonesian Puppetry) in Javanese culture. Some of the characteristics of the wayang version of Arjuna may be different from that of Arjuna in the Indian version of the Mahābhārata book in Sanskrit. In the world of puppetry, Arjuna is described as a knight who likes to travel, meditate, and learn. Apart from being a student of Resi Drona at Padepokan Sukalima, he is also a student of Resi Padmanaba from the Untarayana Hermitage. Arjuna was a brahman in Goa Mintaraga, with the title Bagawan Ciptaning. He was made the superior knight of the gods to destroy Prabu Niwatakawaca, the giant king of the Manimantaka country. For his services, Arjuna was crowned king in Dewa Indra's heaven, with the title King Karitin and get the gift of magical heirlooms from the gods, including: Gendewa (from Bhatara Indra), Ardadadali Arrow (from Bhatara Kuwera), Cundamanik Arrow (from Bhatara Narada). After the Bharatayuddha war, Arjuna became king in Banakeling State, the former Jayadrata kingdom.

Arjuna has a smart and clever nature, is quiet, conscientious, polite, brave and likes to protect the weak. He leads the Madukara Duchy, within the territory of the state of Amarta. He is an unmatched fighter on the battlefield, even though he is slender, handsome as a virgin, soft-hearted despite the will of steel, a knight with a myriad of wives and lovers despite being able to do the toughest asceticism, a knight with deep family loyalty but then able to force  himself to kill his half brother. For the older generation of Java, he was the embodiment of a whole man. Very different from Yudhisthira, he really enjoyed life in the world. His love adventures always amaze the Javanese, but he is strangely different from Don Juan who always chases women. It is said that Arjuna was so refined and handsome that such princesses, as well as the ladies-in-waiting, would immediately offer themselves. They are the ones who get the honor, not Arjuna. He is very different from Wrekudara. He displayed a graceful body and a gentleness that was appreciated by the Javanese of all generations.

Arjuna also has other powerful heirlooms, among others: The Kiai Kalanadah Keris was given to Gatotkaca when he married Dewi Gowa (Arjuna's son), Sangkali Arrow (from Resi Drona), Candranila Arrow, Sirsha Arrow, Sarotama Kiai Arrow, Pasupati Arrow (from Batara Guru), Panah Naracabala, Arrow Ardhadhedhali, Keris Kiai Baruna, Keris Pulanggeni (given to Abhimanyu), Terompet Dewanata, Cupu filled with Jayengkaton oil (given by Bagawan Wilawuk from Pringcendani hermitage) and Ciptawilaha Horse with Kiai Pamuk's whip. Meanwhile, Arjuna's spell includes: Panglimunan, Tunggengmaya, Sepiangin, Mayabumi, Pengasih and Asmaragama. Arjuna also has clothes that symbolize greatness, namely Kampuh or Limarsawo Cloth, Limarkatanggi Belt, Minangkara Gelung, Candrakanta Necklace and Mustika Ampal Ring (formerly belonging to King Ekalaya, the king of the Paranggelung state).

Depictions in popular culture 

Arjuna's extraordinary talents and skills have made him a common name in popular culture.

 The American astronomer Tom Gehrels named a class of asteroids with low inclination, low eccentricity and earth-like orbital period as Arjuna asteroids.
 The Arjuna Award is presented every year in India to one talented sportsperson in every national sport.
 Arjun is a third generation main battle tank developed for the Indian Army.
 Mayilpeeli Thookkam is a ritual art of dance performed in the temples of Kerala. It is also known as Arjuna Nrithyam (‘Arjuna's dance’) as a tribute to his dancing abilities. 
 Arjuna is also an Archer class Servant in the mobile game Fate/Grand Order. He is a minor antagonist in the "E Pluribus Unum" story chapter, where he wishes to fight Karna again.
 The protagonist in Steven Pressfield's 1995 book The Legend of Bagger Vance and its 2000 film adaptation, Rannulph Junuh, is based in part on Arjuna (R. Junuh).

In television and films
There have been serials and films based on Arjuna's life and exploits.

 Earth Maiden Arjuna is a Japanese animated television series created by Shoji Kawamori. This series is based on Arjuna and the Mahabharata. Arjuna: Into the Another World is the soundtrack produced for the series.
 "Arjuna" is a character in Orson Scott Card's Earth Afire (2013) and Earth Awakens (2014).

Television

Films

References
Notes

Citations

Further reading

External links
 

Characters in the Mahabharata
People related to Krishna
Characters in the Bhagavata Purana
Demigods
Mythological archers